Shilong is an industrial town under the direct administration of the prefecture-level city of Dongguan, Guangdong province, People's Republic of China.

Shilong Town is located at the lower reaches of the Dong River at the convergence of the northern stem and southern branch of the Dongjiang River forming one river with three wharfs.

History 
During the Song dynasty (800 years ago), its first inhabitants settled down in Shilong town. Due to the convenient waterway of Dongjian river, Shilong had become a major hub for food supply and woods in the southern China since the late Ming dynasty to the early Qing dynasty. After the opening of the Kowloon-Canton railway (KCR) at 1910, which passed through Shilong, its status as a traffic and commercial center had been strengthened and its economic boomed. Shilong made its name in history as one of the 'Four Big Town in Guangdong'. Thanks to its famous weightlifting world record breaker - Chen Jin-Kai, Shilong also has won its reputation as the 'Home Town of Weight Lifting'.

January 16, 1937 – Aboard an express from Hong Kong (now in China) to Canton (now Guangzhou), fire breaks out in the third-class section. One source refers to a passenger setting fire to a toy made of celluloid, another to a sulfuric acid explosion. The train has neither continuous brakes nor any way to notify the driver.  The three rear cars of the train are completely burned and bodies of passengers who jumped are scattered along the tracks.  Altogether 112 people are killed and at least 40 injured.

Location 
Shilong town is located within the north part of Dongguan prefecture-level city. It is situated at the central point of the Pearl River Delta, in conjunction with Zengcheng District and Boluo County, 69 km to Guangzhou city and 78 km to Shenzhen city. The town lies on the shore of the Dongjiang River and the Guangshen Railway passes by.

Transport 
Its convenience in railway and water transportation makes Shilong a regional industrial and commercial center. There are 20 buses for every 10 thousand people in the town, and there are 27 bus lines open to traffic to peripheral cities, and there are 83 pairs of electrified express intercity passenger buses between Guangzhou and Shenzhen each day, so the residents share comparatively a large space for activities and the intercity effect has been utilized to the greatest extent.

There is a bus service from Shilong to Shenzhen Bao'an International Airport in Shenzhen.

Economy 
In 2004, Shilong's GDP amounted to 3.66 billion RMB  and the scale export income boosted to $1.14 billion. Shilong is very strong in the IT industry. For instance, 2.4 million cameras, 3 million computers, 750 thousand photocopiers and 1.8 million digital laser printers were manufactured in Shilong by 2004, most of which were exported.

Dongguan Prison is also located in Shilong.

Ecology 
In 2008, Shilong was chosen by the State as a “famous historical and cultural town in China”. There are 27 remaining ancient trees, including one tree at the age of more than 300 years and 16 trees at the ages of more than 100 years. The Government of the Town establishes electronic archives for ancient and famous trees by building their name cards so that it can manage those ancient trees scientifically and effectively; and there are 28 places of historical and cultural interests, including five places as the key cultural relic protective units at the municipal level.

Culture 
In order to protect intangible cultural heritage, the Government of the Town has set up the development fund for Cantonese Opera. Now, there are five folk ballad singers' associations, who hold free performances in Yat-sen Park in turn every Saturday evening. Furthermore, different kinds of museums and exhibition centers have been built as cultural and educational bases.

In 2005, it was listed as the Dragon Boat Champion Center in China by the National General Administration of Sports. Each year, there are more than 90 cultural and artistic evening parties of all kinds and more than 30 art shows.

notable people:

Zhang, yin Lin ( 張蔭麟 ), a historian, born in 1905, and died in 1942.

Michelle Yim，a Hong Kong actress, Michelle born in September 2, 1955.

See also
 Shilong railway station

References

External links
 Shilong Official Website

Geography of Dongguan
Towns in Guangdong